Nowica  (Novytsia, Novytsia) is a village in the administrative district of Gmina Uście Gorlickie, within Gorlice County, Lesser Poland Voivodeship, in southern Poland, close to the border with Slovakia.

The village has a population of 120. The population includes Polish and Lemko ethnicities.

References

Nowica